The Small Satellite Launch Vehicle (SSLV) is a small-lift launch vehicle developed by ISRO with payload capacity to deliver  to low Earth orbit or  to Sun-synchronous orbit for launching small satellites, with the capability to support multiple orbital drop-offs. SSLV is made keeping low cost, low turnaround time in mind with launch-on-demand flexibility under minimal infrastructure requirements.

The maiden flight SSLV-D1 was conducted on 7 August 2022, from the First Launch Pad, but failed to orbit. A second flight on 10 February 2023 successfully delivered payloads to orbit.

In the future, a dedicated launch site called SSLV Launch Complex (SLC) near Kulasekharapatnam in Tamil Nadu will handle SSLV launches to Sun-synchronous orbit. After entering the operational phase, the vehicle's production and launch operations will be done by a consortium of Indian firms along with NewSpace India Limited (NSIL).

Vehicle description 

The SSLV was developed with the aim of launching small satellites commercially at drastically reduced price and higher launch rate compared to Polar Satellite Launch Vehicle (PSLV).

The projected high launch rate relies on largely autonomous launch operation and on overall simple logistics. To compare, a PSLV launch involves 600 officials while SSLV launch operations would be managed by a small team of about six people. The launch readiness period of the SSLV is expected to be less than a week instead of months. The launch vehicle can be assembled both vertically like the existing PSLV and Geosynchronous Satellite Launch Vehicle (GSLV) and horizontally like the retired Satellite Launch Vehicle (SLV) and Augmented Satellite Launch Vehicle (ASLV).

The first three stages of the vehicle use HTPB based solid propellant, with a fourth terminal stage being a Velocity-Trimming Module (VTM) with  eight 50 N thrusters for reaction control and eight 50 N axial thrusters for changing velocity. With these VTM can add delta-v of up to 172 m/s.

The first stage (SS1) and third stage (SS3) of SSLV are newly developed while second stage (SS2) is derived from third stage (HPS3) of PSLV.

Vehicle characteristics:

 Height: 34 meters
 Diameter: 2 meters
 Mass: 120 tonnes

SSLV Launch Complex 

The early developmental flights and those to inclined orbits will launch from Sriharikota, at first using existing launch pads and later from dedicated facility called SSLV Launch Complex (SLC) in Kulasekharapatnam. Tenders related to manufacturing, installation, assembly, inspection, testing and Self Propelled launching Unit (SPU) were released in October 2019.

This new spaceport, under development, near Kulasekharapatnam in Tamil Nadu will handle SSLV launches to Sun-synchronous orbit when complete.

History

Development 
In 2016, a National Institute of Advanced Studies report by Rajaram Nagappa proposed development path of a 'Small Satellite launch Vehicle-1' to launch strategic payloads. In National Space Science Symposium 2016, then Director of Liquid Propulsion Systems Centre, S. Somanath also acknowledged a need for identifying a cost effective launch vehicle configuration with 500 kg payload capacity to LEO and by November 2017, development of such launch vehicle was underway.

By December 2018, the Vikram Sarabhai Space Centre (VSSC) completed the design for the vehicle.

In December 2020, all booster segments for SSLV first stage (SS1) static test (ST01) were received and assembly was done in Second Vehicle Assembly Building (SVAB).

The first static fire test (ST01) of the SS1 first-stage booster conducted on 18 March 2021 was unsuccessful. About 60 seconds into the test, oscillations were observed and after 95 seconds, the nozzle of SS1 stage disintegrated. The nominal duration of test was 110 seconds. To qualify for flight, SSLV's solid first stage SS1 has to perform two consecutive nominal static fire tests.

The SSLV Payload Fairing (SPLF) functional qualification test was completed in August 2021.

The second static fire test of SSLV first stage SS1 was conducted on 14 March 2022 at SDSC-SHAR and met the required test objectives.

Operational history

SSLV-D1 
The first developmental flight of the SSLV occurred on 7 August 2022. The flight mission was named SSLV-D1. The SSLV-D1 flight failed to achieve its mission objectives.

The rocket had a three stage configuration with a fourth Velocity Trimming Module (VTM). In its D1 configuration, the rocket was 34m tall with a diameter of 2m and a lift-off mass of 120t.

The rocket carried EOS 02, an Earth observation satellite that weighed 135 kg and AzaadiSAT, a CubeSat payload that weighed 8 kg, developed by Indian students to promote inclusivity in STEM education. The SSLV-D1 was supposed to place the two satellite payloads in a circular orbit of altitude 356.2 km with 37.2° inclination.

The official explanation by the ISRO for the mission failure was software malfunction. According to the ISRO, the mission software detected an accelerometer anomaly during the second stage separation. This caused the rocket navigation to switch from a closed loop guidance to an open loop guidance. Even though, this switch in guidance mode was part of the redundancy built into the rocket's navigation, it could not salvage the mission.

During the open loop guidance mode, the final VTM stage only managed to fire for 0.1s instead of the intended 20s. This led to the two satellites as well as the VTM stage of the rocket being injected into an unstable elliptical transatmospheric orbit of 360.56×75.66 km with an inclination of 36.56°.

The SSLV-D1’s final VTM stage had 16 hydrazine (MMH+MON3) fueled  thrusters. Eight of those were to provide altitude control and the remaining eight for controlling the orbital velocity. The VTM stage also provided pitch, yaw and roll control during the orbital insertion maneuvers. The three main stages of the SSLV-D1 functioned normally. But, that was not enough to impart adequate impulse for the two satellite payloads to achieve stable orbits. For the injection of the two satellite payloads into their intended stable orbits, the VTM stage had to fire for at least 20 seconds, to impart enough additional orbital velocity and altitude corrections. Instead the VTM kicked-in at 653.5s and shut itself down at 653.6s, post lift-off. Following the partial firing of the VTM stage, the EOS 02 was released at 738.5s and AazadiSAT at 788.4s, post-liftoff. These failures transpired, resulting in the satellites entering an unstable orbit and subsequently destroyed upon reentry.

Launches

See also 
 
 Polar Satellite Launch Vehicle
 Small-lift launch vehicle
 Indian Space Research Organisation

References

External links
 

Small Satellite Launch Vehicle
ISRO space launch vehicles
Expendable space launch systems
Vehicles introduced in 2022